Rajdeep Chatterjee is an Indian playback singer and musician from Jamshedpur in the Indian state of Jharkhand. He participated in the Indian music shows Sa Re Ga Ma Pa L'il Champs, Indian Idol 4 and Sitaron Ko Choona Hai.

Early life 
Chatterjee was interested in music from age two and studied under Pandit Shri Chandrakant Apte. He graduated with a degree in Indian classical music. He was top Finalist of Zee TV music show Sa Re Ga Ma Pa L'il Champs in 2006. Rajdeep ranked fourth in 2008 on Indian Idol. He was declared one of the best singers of all four seasons of the show by judges Anu Malik, Javed Akhtar, Kailash Kher and Sonali Bendre.

He was declared as the "Jharkhand Icon" by the Symbiosis group along with Film director Imtiaz Ali.

He recorded a song for AR Rahman in his studio for his show in Germany and a song for a Tamil film with Shreya Ghoshal.

Rajdeep's first ever Bollywood playback is in the movie Bodyguard, where he is part of the team of "Band of Powers" who sang the title track of that movie. Recently he sang the title track for Akshay Kumar's newest release, Khiladi 786 he voiced music the action movies Policegiri and Gunday. He has performed more than 200 shows in India as well as abroad.

Reality shows

Discography

References 

Living people
Bollywood playback singers
Indian male playback singers
1991 births
People from Jamshedpur